Odwell is a surname. Notable people with the surname include:

Dave Odwell (born 1952), British boxer
Fred Odwell (1872–1948), American baseball player
George Odwell (1911–1995), British boxer

See also
Odell (surname)
Oswell